Symbolic is the sixth and penultimate studio album by American death metal band Death, released on March 21, 1995, by Roadrunner Records. The album was remastered and reissued on April 1, 2008, with five bonus tracks. It is the only album to feature Bobby Koelble and Kelly Conlon on guitar and bass, respectively, and the second and last album to feature drummer Gene Hoglan.  The album has received unanimous critical acclaim.

Musical style
Symbolic shows a continued shift in sound from Death's previous albums; the music became less focused on the traditional death metal template and more focused on increasing melodic aspects. Symbolic has been described as technical death metal and melodic death metal.

Release
Symbolic was released by Roadrunner Records on March 21, 1995.

Reception

Symbolic has received widespread critical acclaim and is regarded by many as being Death’s greatest album, and as being one of the greatest death metal albums of all time. In a contemporary review, Select stated that "there're still lashings of gristly, growling vocals and head-in-the-groin thrashing to be had" as a listener can "snuggle up to witness what dark depths Death's 12-year career has taken them too [sic]". 

A review of the 2008 re-issue in Record Collector stated that the album was as "close to flawless as metal gets, and a testament to the drive and talent of the much-missed Schuldiner". Canadian journalist Martin Popoff considered the album "the band's most impressive and crossover-ish to date", combining conventional metal, "traces of doomy, Germanic melody and heaps of progressive might." Some reviews were less favorable; Stephen Thomas Erlewine of AllMusic noted that "some of the riffs are beginning to sound a little tired and there is no great leap forward in terms of their musical ideas", though he noted that "the sheer visceral force of their sound should please their dedicated fans".  

The webzine Metal Rules ranked the album as the 7th greatest extreme metal album and the 58th greatest heavy metal album of all time.

Track listing

Personnel
Personnel adapted from the CD liner notes of the original 1995 release and the 2008 reissue.

Death
 Chuck Schuldiner – vocals, guitar
 Bobby Koelble – guitar
 Kelly Conlon – bass
 Gene Hoglan – drums

Additional musicians
 Steve Di Giorgio – bass (tracks 10–13, 2008 remaster)

Technical personnel
 Chuck Schuldiner – production
 Jim Morris – production, engineering
 George Marino – mastering, remastering
 Patricia Mooney – design
 René Miville – artwork, photography

References

1995 albums
Death (metal band) albums
Roadrunner Records albums
Albums recorded at Morrisound Recording